South Flannigan Township is one of twelve townships in Hamilton County, Illinois, USA.  As of the 2010 census, its population was 116 and it contained 74 housing units.  It was formed from Flannigan Township.

Geography

Unincorporated towns
 University at 
(This list is based on USGS data and may include former settlements.)

Cemeteries
The township contains these two cemeteries: Good Hope and Winn.

Demographics

School districts
 Galatia Community Unit School District 1
 Hamilton County Community Unit School District 10
 Thompsonville Community Unit School District 174

Political districts
 Illinois's 19th congressional district
 State House District 117
 State Senate District 59

References
 
 United States Census Bureau 2009 TIGER/Line Shapefiles
 United States National Atlas

External links
 City-Data.com
 Illinois State Archives
 Township Officials of Illinois
 Hamilton County Historical Society

Townships in Hamilton County, Illinois
Mount Vernon, Illinois micropolitan area
Townships in Illinois